Tre Urat or Three Bridges is a location  in southeastern Albania where a border crossing point between Albania and Greece is situated.

References 

Albania–Greece border crossings